The Turkey national women's rugby union team represents Turkey at rugby union – however it has yet to play any recognised international matches. Rugby union in Turkey is administered by the Turkish Rugby Federation. At present, the Federation is not a member of the IRB and so, currently, any internationals it may play are unlikely to be widely recognised. Şahin Kömürcü is the president of the Turkish Rugby Federation.

Competitive record 
 2021 Rugby Europe Women's Sevens Trophy
 2019 Rugby Europe Women's Sevens Trophy
 2018 Rugby Europe Women's Sevens Conference
 2016 Rugby Europe Women's Sevens Conference
 2015 Rugby Europe Women's Sevens – Division B
 2014 Rugby Europe Women's Sevens – Division B
 2013 FIRA-AER Women's Sevens – Division B

Record

Overall record

Results

See also
 Rugby union in Turkey

External links
 Report of visit by FIRA officials to Turkey
 Stephane Vincent (originally a foreigner) is the top scorrer of Turkey
 Şahin Kömürcü (the president of four sports in Turkey)
 Results

Notes and references

 

European national women's rugby union teams
Rugby union in Turkey
Rugby union